The Wisconsin Badgers men's ice hockey team is the college ice hockey team that represents the University of Wisconsin–Madison in Madison, Wisconsin. The team plays at the Kohl Center and was most recently coached by Tony Granato. The Badgers ice hockey team competes in the Big Ten Conference.

The Badgers have won three WCHA regular season conference titles and 11 conference tournament titles. They have also made 24 appearances in the NCAA men's ice hockey tournament, advancing to the Frozen Four 12 times. The team's six national titles rank fourth best in college hockey history.

Their most recent national championship came in 2006 when the Badgers defeated the Boston College Eagles 2–1 at the Bradley Center in Milwaukee, Wisconsin.

History

Early history
Pond hockey had been played on Lake Mendota in Madison since the late 1800s. The University of Wisconsin formed an informal hockey program in the 1910s. The 1921 season saw the development of intercollegiate hockey at Michigan, Wisconsin, and Minnesota. Michigan and Wisconsin scheduled four games to be played on consecutive weekends from February 18 to 26, 1921.

Modern era
The modern era of Badger hockey began in 1963 with the decision of athletic director Ivan B. Williamson. The Badgers played home games at the Hartmeyer Ice Arena before moving to the Dane County Coliseum in 1967. The program began as an independent NCAA Division I team and scheduling 8 games against Western Collegiate Hockey Association teams, losing all 8 games. Late in the 1965–66 season, the Badgers finally broke through, beating the Minnesota Golden Gophers 5–4 in overtime, their first win over a WCHA opponent. At the end of that season, Coach John Riley retired.

Johnson era

In 1966, Wisconsin hired "Badger" Bob Johnson. Under Johnson, Wisconsin was offered WCHA membership for the 1969–70 season. In that same season the Badgers received a bid to the NCAA Division I Men's Ice Hockey Tournament.  The Badgers won their first national championship at the 1973 Frozen Four. Badger Bob's 1977 team was one of the most successful to date, as the team swept through WCHA tournament and 1977 NCAA Tournament. Behind the efforts of four first team All-Americans, Mike Eaves, Mark Johnson (Bob's son), Craig Norwich and Julian Baretta, the 1977 team won the title with a 6–5 victory in overtime against Michigan.

Despite losing one of their top players, Mark Johnson, to the 1980 American Olympic Team, the Badgers reached the NCAA title game three consecutive times in 1981, 1982, and 1983. Winning the program's third title in 1981 by defeating rival Minnesota in the championship game 6–3. After again reaching the championship game in 1982, where the Badgers lost to North Dakota, the program was dealt a second blow with the departure of Johnson. He would later coach in the NHL and win the Stanley Cup with the Pittsburgh Penguins. He left Wisconsin after 15 seasons with 3 NCAA championships, a record of 367–175–23, and having built the program into an NCAA powerhouse.

Sauer era
Former Badger assistant coach Jeff Sauer was hired in 1982 to replace Bob Johnson as head coach. Sauer won the 1983 NCAA championship in his first season. Wisconsin defeated Harvard 6–2 to earn the program's fourth NCAA title. Under Sauer's leadership, the Badgers qualified for eight consecutive NCAA tournaments from 1988 to 1995, and won the program's 5th NCAA title in 1990, with a 7–3 victory over Colgate. Also, Sauer presided over the team's move from the aging Coliseum to the new, on-campus Kohl Center in 1998. The Badger men led the nation in college hockey attendance every year from moving to the Kohl Center through the 2011 season.

Wisconsin again reached the 1992 NCAA Championship game against Lake Superior State, losing 5–3. The game, which featured some questionable calls by the referee that continually put the Badgers at a two-man disadvantage, irked several players so much that they lashed out beyond Sauer's control, verbally abusing the referees and earning Sauer a one-game NCAA suspension. Assistant Coach Bill Zito received a two-game suspension, while players Blaine Moore and Jason Zent each received a one-game suspension. That game was later vacated by the NCAA for rules violations unrelated to the incidents in the championship game. In the mid-1990s, Badger hockey earned NCAA bids in 1998 and 2000, but generally underachieved compared to the high standards of the 1970s and 1980s. The 1999–2000 team featured a duo of second overall NHL draft pick Dany Heatley and Steven Reinprecht, won the MacNaughton Cup, and earned a No. 1 position in the polls for most of the season, only to be upset by Boston College in the NCAA regionals. Two seasons later, during the 2001–02 season, coach Sauer announced his retirement. Jeff Sauer left Wisconsin with two NCAA titles and a record of 489–306–46 at Wisconsin, and a 655–532–57 overall record as a head coach.

Eaves era

Sauer's replacement was Mike Eaves, a former player who was a captain on the 1977 NCAA championship team and still holds the record as Wisconsin's all-time leading scorer. In 2003–04, Eaves brought the Badgers just short of the Frozen Four, falling in overtime to Maine in the 2004 NCAA Tournament. The Badgers returned to national prominence by winning the 2006 NCAA championship in Milwaukee with a 2–1 win over Boston College.  In 2010, the Badgers returned to the NCAA championship, vying for a seventh NCAA title but lost 5–0 to Boston College at Ford Field in Detroit, Michigan, in front of a then-record crowd for an indoor ice hockey game of 37,592. In 2011, they missed the WCHA Final Five and NCAA tournament completely. In 2012, the team missed the NCAA Tournament again. In 2013 they were winners in their last-ever appearance in the WCHA Final Five before the team joined the newly established Big Ten Hockey conference for the 2013–14 season. In the inaugural season of the Big Ten Hockey conference, the Badgers won the Big Ten Tournament, their second consecutive conference tournament championship. The 2014–15 season was the worst season in team history. They finished the season with a record of 4–26–5, setting school records for fewest wins and most losses in a season. Eaves was fired on March 18, 2016 after finishing the 2015–16 season with an 8–19–8 record.

Granato era
Athletic director Barry Alvarez hired Detroit Red Wings assistant Tony Granato to replace Eaves in late March 2016. Also hired were Tony's younger brother Don Granato, coach of the U.S. National Team Development Program's under-17 team, and Mark Osiecki, associate head coach of the American Hockey League's Rockford IceHogs and former assistant coach at Wisconsin for six years in the 2000s. Tony Granato signed a five-year contract worth $2.75 million while Osiecki and his brother signed three-year deals worth a total of $660,000 a piece. The hires were seen as getting UW Men's Ice Hockey back on track, and was noticed by media, such as the Wisconsin State Journal, when they said "Alvarez answered the critics who think UW no longer cares about men’s hockey in the best way he could" during the press conference introducing all three coaches Alvarez stated "I’m very confident that we’ve taken the right steps today in re-establishing the dominance of our hockey program" All three coaches are Wisconsin alums; Tony Granato played from 1983 to 1987 where he was an All-American, Don Granato played from 1987 to 1991, and Osiecki played from 1987 to 1990. After all three coaches were hired the phrase "Dream Team" came to be used when referring to UW's new coaching staff, it was first used by Barry Alvarez when he said "It was more than I could dream for to get all three of those guys. To me, it's the Dream Team."

In Granato's first season, he led the team back to respectability with a 20-15-1 overall record and a 12-8 conference record, good enough for second place. On March 18, they lost the conference championship game to Penn State 2–1 in double overtime.

On March 6, 2023, University of Wisconsin Director of Athletics Chris McIntosh announced that Granato would not return for the 2023-24 season.

Season-by-season results

Source:

Coaches

All-time coaching records
As of the end of the 2022–23 season

* Interim

Championships

Big Ten Tournament

WCHA Tournament

NCAA Championship Appearances
Wisconsin appeared in the championship game in the following years:

Statistical Leaders
Source:

Career points leaders

Career goaltending leaders

GP = Games played; Min = Minutes played; W = Wins; L = Losses; T = Ties; GA = Goals against; SO = Shutouts; SV% = Save percentage; GAA = Goals against average

Minimum 30 games played

Statistics current through the start of the 2019–20 season.

Olympians
This is a list of Wisconsin alumni were a part of an Olympic team.

Players

Current roster
As of September 8, 2022.

Awards and honors

Hockey Hall of Fame
Source:

Chris Chelios (2013)
Bob Johnson (1992)

United States Hockey Hall of Fame
Source:

Chris Chelios (2011)
Bob Johnson (1991)
Mark Johnson (2004)
Mike Richter (2008)
Jeff Sauer (2014)
Gary Suter (2011)

NCAA

Individual awards

Hobey Baker Award
Blake Geoffrion: 2010
Cole Caufield: 2021

Derek Hines Unsung Hero Award
Aidan Cavallini: 2017

NCAA Scoring Champion
Delbert Dehate: 1968
Mike Eaves: 1978
Mark Johnson: 1979
Steven Reinprecht: 2000
Cole Caufield: 2021

Tournament Most Outstanding Player
Dean Talafous: 1973
Julian Baretta: 1977
Marc Behrend: 1981, 1983
Chris Tancill: 1990
Robbie Earl: 2006

All-Americans
AHCA First Team All-Americans

1969-70: John Jagger, D
1971-72: Jeff Rotsch, D
1974-75: Brian Engblom, D
1975-76: Craig Norwich, D; Mike Eaves, F
1976-77: Julian Baretta, G; Craig Norwich, D; Mike Eaves, F
1977-78: Mike Eaves, F; Mark Johnson, F
1978-79: Mark Johnson, F
1979-80: Roy Schultz, G; Theran Welsh, D
1981-82: Bruce Driver, D; John Newberry, F
1982-83: Patrick Flatley, F
1987-88: Paul Stanton, D; Paul Ranheim, F
1989-90: Gary Shuchuk, F
1992-93: Barry Richter, D
1994-95: Brian Rafalski, D
1999-00: Jeff Dessner, D; Steven Reinprecht, F
2000-01: Dany Heatley, F
2003-04: Bernd Brückler, G
2005-06: Brian Elliott, G
2008-09: Jamie McBain, D
2009-10: Brendan Smith, D; Blake Geoffrion, F
2010-11: Justin Schultz, D
2011-12: Justin Schultz, D
2013-14: Jake McCabe, D
2020-21: Cole Caufield, F

AHCA Second Team All-Americans

1984-85: Tim Thomas, D; Tony Granato, F
1986-87: Tony Granato, F
1987-88: Dean Anderson, G; Steve Tuttle, F
1988-89: Curtis Joseph, G
1990-91: Sean Hill, D
1991-92: Duane Derksen, G
1996-97: Kirk Daubenspeck, G
1999-00: Dany Heatley, F
2005-06: Tom Gilbert, D; Joe Pavelski, F
2010-11: Jake Gardiner, D
2013-14: Michael Mersch, F
2014-15: Michael Mersch, F
2016-17: Luke Kunin, F
2020-21: Dylan Holloway, F; Linus Weissbach, F

WCHA

Individual awards

Most Valuable Player
Mike Eaves: 1978
Mark Johnson: 1979
Curtis Joseph: 1989
Gary Shuchuk: 1990
Duane Derksen: 1992
Steven Reinprecht: 2000
Jamie McBain: 2009

Freshman of the Year
Mark Johnson: 1977
Mike Richter: 1986
Curtis Joseph: 1989
Jim Carey: 1993
Dany Heatley: 2000

Coach of the Year
Bob Johnson: 1977

Tournament Most Outstanding Player
Dean Anderson: 1988
Steve Rohlik: 1990
Kirk Daubenspeck: 1995
Joe Bianchi: 1998
Nic Kerdiles: 2013

Defensive Player of the Year
Brian Rafalski: 1995
Jeff Dessner: 2000
Brendan Smith: 2010
Justin Schultz: 2011, 2012

Student-Athlete of the Year
Tony Granato: 1987

All-Conference Teams
First Team All-WCHA

1974-75: Brian Engblom, D
1976-77: Julian Baretta, G; Craig Norwich, D
1977-78: Mike Eaves, F; Mark Johnson, F
1978-79: Mark Johnson, F
1979-80: Roy Schultz, G
1981-82: Bruce Driver, D; John Newberry, F
1982-83: Patrick Flatley, F
1984-85: Tim Thomas, D
1987-88: Paul Ranheim, F
1988-89: Curtis Joseph, G; Paul Stanton, D
1989-90: Gary Shuchuk, F
1991-92: Duane Derksen, G
1992-93: Barry Richter, D
1993-94: Kelly Fairchild, F
1994-95: Brian Rafalski, D
1997-98: Craig Anderson, D
1999-00: Jeff Dessner, D; Dany Heatley, F; Steven Reinprecht, F
2003-04: Bernd Brückler, G
2005-06: Tom Gilbert, D
2008-09: Jamie McBain, D
2009-10: Brendan Smith, D; Blake Geoffrion, F
2010-11: Justin Schultz, D
2011-12: Justin Schultz, D

Second Team All-WCHA

1969-70: Wayne Thomas, G; John Jagger, D; Murray Heatley, F
1970-71: John Jagger, D; Murray Heatley, F
1971-72: Jim Makey, G
1972-73: Jim Makey, G; Norm Cherrey, F
1975-76: Craig Norwich, D
1976-77: John Taft, F; Mike Eaves, F
1977-78: Julian Baretta, G
1978-79: Bob Suter, D
1979-80: Theran Welsh, D
1980-81: Theran Welsh, D
1981-82: Marc Behrend, G
1982-83: Bruce Driver, D; Chris Chelios, D; Paul Houck, F
1984-85: Tony Granato, F
1985-86: Marty Wiitala, D
1986-87: Mike Richter, G; Paul Ranheim, F; Tony Granato, F
1987-88: Dean Anderson, G; Paul Stanton, D; Steve Tuttle, F
1988-89: John Byce, F
1989-90: Duane Derksen, G; Sean Hill, D; John Byce, F
1990-91: Duane Derksen, G; Sean Hill, D
1992-93: Jim Carey, G
1993-94: Andrew Shier, F
1996-97: Kirk Daubenspeck, G
1997-98: Steven Reinprecht, F
2000-01: Dany Heatley, F
2004-05: Bernd Brückler, G; Robbie Earl, F
2005-06: Brian Elliott, G; Joe Pavelski, F
2006-07: Brian Elliott, G
2009-10: Ryan McDonagh, D
2010-11: Jake Gardiner, D

Big Ten

Individual awards

Player of the Year
Cole Caufield: 2021

Freshman of the Year
Trent Frederic: 2017
Cole Caufield: 2020

Scoring Champion
Cole Caufield: 2020, 2021

Coach of the Year
Tony Granato: 2017, 2021

Tournament Most Outstanding Player
Mark Zengerle: 2014

All-Conference Teams
First Team All-Big Ten

2013–14: Jake McCabe, D; Michael Mersch, F; Mark Zengerle, F
2019–20: Wyatt Kalynuk, D; Cole Caufield, F
2020–21: Cole Caufield, F; Dylan Holloway, F

Second Team All-Big Ten

2013–14: Joe Rumpel, G; Frankie Simonelli, D; Nic Kerdiles, F
2016–17: Jake Linhart, D; Trent Frederic, F; Luke Kunin, F
2018–19: Wyatt Kalynuk, D
2020–21: Linus Weissbach, F

Big Ten All-Rookie Team

2015–16: Luke Kunin, F
2016–17: Trent Frederic, F
2017–18: Wyatt Kalynuk, D; Linus Weissbach, F
2018–19: K'Andre Miller, F
2019–20: Cole Caufield, F
2020–21: Cameron Rowe, G

Wisconsin Badgers Hall of Fame
The following is a list of people associated with the Wisconsin men's ice hockey program who were elected into the University of Wisconsin Athletic Hall of Fame (induction date in parentheses).

Steve Alley (2001)
Marc Behrend (2006)
Chris Chelios (2011)
Delbert Dehate (2007)
Bruce Driver (2016)
Mike Eaves (1992)
Brian Elliott (2017)
Tony Granato (2000)
Bill Howard (2019)
Jim Johannson (2018)
Bob Johnson (1992)
Mark Johnson (1991)
Craig Norwich (2008)
Brian Rafalski (2015)
Steven Reinprecht (2014)
Mike Richter (2005)
Jeff Sauer (2016)
Bob Suter (2017)
Dean Talafous (2013)
Theran Welsh (2010)

Badgers in the NHL
As of July 1, 2022.

Source:

See also
Wisconsin Badgers women's ice hockey
Wisconsin Badgers
University of Wisconsin–Madison

References

External links

Official site

 
Ice hockey teams in Wisconsin
Big Ten Conference ice hockey